Félix Lavilla Muñarriz (11 June 1928, Pamplona – 14 January 2013 Madrid) was a Spanish pianist, composer and a well-known accompanist, son of a music teacher and band master of the municipal band of Errenteria in Gipuzkoa, Basque Autonomous Community. He was perhaps best known for his collaborations with the mezzo-soprano Teresa Berganza, to whom he was married from 1957 to 1977. The couple regularly recorded and gave recitals together.

References

Spanish classical pianists
Male classical pianists
1928 births
2013 deaths
Accompanists
20th-century classical pianists
20th-century Spanish musicians
20th-century Spanish male musicians